Master printmakers or master printers are specialized technicians who hand-print editions of works of an artist in printmaking. Master printmakers often own and/or operate their own printmaking studio or print shop. Business activities of a Master printshop may include: publishing and printing services, educational workshops or classes, mentorship of artists, and artist residencies. 

The role of the specialist printers mostly emerged from the 18th century onwards. Previously artists in printmaking mostly printed their own prints, as for example Rembrandt did; he had a printing press for etchings and engravings in his house.  For woodcuts the blockcutter had long been a specialist artisan, sometimes famous.  Printing of lithographs from the 19th century on has normally been a specialist process. 

Training for master printmakers varies by technique, geography, and culture. Master printmakers are almost always trained by other master printmakers. The Tamarind Institute is one formal institution mandated to train master lithographers, located in New Mexico. In the 20th century in Britain there was a federation of master printers called the British Printing Industries Federation, renamed the British Federation of Master Printers (BFMP) in the 1930s and then again renamed the British Printing Industries Federation in the 1970s.

Notable people

Contemporary, mostly Americans

Historical master printmakers, mostly American

See also 

 List of printmakers
Old master print
 Old master
International Print Center New York

References 

Printmaking
Printing occupations